Wushishi is a Local Government Area in Niger State, Nigeria. Its headquarters is in the town of Wushishi.

Wushishi is located between Longitude 9°43'N and Latitude 6°04'E and it has an area of 1,879 km and a population of 81,783 at the 2006 census.

The postal code of the area is 922.

References

Local Government Areas in Niger State